Antoine Coly (born 25 April 1964 in Senegal) is a Senegalese retired footballer.

Career

In 1988, Coly signed for Linfield F.C.

References

1964 births
Living people
Senegalese footballers
Association football midfielders
Léopold FC players